Belott is an unincorporated community in Houston County, Texas, United States.  It is located along the route of the Old San Antonio Road, about twelve miles northeast of Crockett. The population was 101 according to the 2000 census.

History
It was first settled around the time of the Civil War. Named for a prominent early settler, Andrew J. Belott, a school was built in the 1870s, and a post office operated in the community from 1890 to 1908.  By the 1930s the settlement had a church, a school, four stores, and an estimated population of fifty. In 1936 the school was merged with a school in nearby Glover, Texas and in 1968 the Glover school became part of the Kennard Independent School District.   Today the settlement is considered a dispersed rural community.

References

External links
 

Unincorporated communities in Houston County, Texas
Unincorporated communities in Texas